The 1951–52 SM-sarja season was the 21st season of the SM-sarja, the top level of ice hockey in Finland. 10 teams participated in the league, and Ilves Tampere won the championship.

Regular season

Group A

Group B

3rd place
 HJK Helsinki - Tarmo Hämeenlinna 3:8/1:7

Final 
 HPK Hämeenlinna - Ilves Tampere 1:6/3:4

External links
 Season on hockeyarchives.info

Fin
Liiga seasons
1951–52 in Finnish ice hockey